The men's 1500 metre freestyle event at the 2016 Summer Olympics took place on 12–13 August at the Olympic Aquatics Stadium.

Summary
Italian swimmer and 2015 world champion Gregorio Paltrinieri outlasted the field on the closing stages to become his country's first ever Olympic champion in the program's longest pool race. Strengthening his lead from start to finish, Paltrinieri headed into the 1,400-metre turn under a world-record pace, but fell off towards the end for the gold medal in 14:34.57. U.S. distance ace Connor Jaeger overhauled the sub-14:40 barrier with an American record of 14:39.48 for the silver. Meanwhile, Paltrinieri's countryman Gabriele Detti gave the Italians a further reason to celebrate, as he powered home with a bronze in 14:40.86, overtaking the American challenger Jordan Wilimovsky (14:45.03) by almost five seconds.

Australia's Mack Horton, who claimed the 400 m freestyle title on night one, picked up the fifth spot with a 14:49.54 to hold off a sprint race from Canada's Ryan Cochrane (14:49.61), two-time medalist in this event, by seven hundredths of a second.  France's Damien Joly finished seventh in 14:52.73, with Norway's Henrik Christiansen (15:02.66) rounding out the top eight field.

China's world-record holder Sun Yang missed a chance to defend his Olympic title in this event, after posting the sixteenth fastest time (15:01.97) in the preliminary competition. Meanwhile, Tunisian swimmer and Beijing 2008 champion Oussama Mellouli failed to advance to the top eight final with a twenty-first-place finish in his fifth Olympic appearance.

Records

Competition format

The competition consisted of two rounds: heats and a final. The swimmers with the best 8 times in the heats advanced to the final. Swim-offs were used as necessary to break ties for advancement to the next round.

Results

Heats

Final

References

Men's 001500 metre freestyle
Olympics
Men's events at the 2016 Summer Olympics